National Institute of Disaster Management (NIDM), is a premier institute for training and capacity development programs for managing natural disasters in India, on a national as well as regional basis. The National Centre of Disaster Management (NCDM), constituted under an Act of Parliament in 1995; was re-designated to give the present name of National Institute of Disaster Management (NIDM) by the Disaster Management Act 2005 passed by President of India on 9 January 2006,

History
The International Decade for Natural Disaster Reduction, proposed with the purpose of ensuring the implementation of the International Strategy for Disaster Reduction prompted the Indian Institute of Public Administration (IIPA) under the Ministry of Agriculture and Cooperation, the nodal ministry for disaster management in India to establish a national centre for management and planning the control of such natural disasters in 1995. The center was later upgraded as the National Institute of Disaster management (NIDM) on 16 October 2003, with the transfer of the subject of disaster management to the Ministry of Home Affairs. The institute was inaugurated by Home Minister of India on 11 August 2004.

Origin and responsibilities
The United Nations designated the 1990s as the International Decade for Natural Disaster Reduction (IDNDR).  In 1995, the Ministry of Agriculture and Cooperation, nominally responsible for disaster management in India, created the National Centre for Disaster Management.  When responsibility for disaster management was transferred to the Ministry of Home Affairs, the Centre became the National Institute of Disaster Management.  The institute was officially inaugurated by the Union Home Minister on 11 August 2004.

The National Disaster Management Act of 2005 granted the Institute statutory organisation status.  The Act holds the Institute responsible for "planning and promoting training and research in the area of disaster management, documentation and development of national level information base relating to disaster management policies, prevention mechanisms and mitigation measures".

The NIDM has been mandated by the Govt. of India (NDMA – as per DM Act 2005, guidelines for NIDM) to be a deemed University and institute of excellence on higher learning and capacity building. UGC has worked out with NIDM and developed a model curriculum for strengthening disaster management in higher education and research. Most Central Universities have envisaged Centre for Disaster Management under their School of Environmental Studies. A core group is being formed with UGC-NIDM to promote the subject at Academic Staff Colleges as well.

Training
The NIDM works under government's directives to train and conduct periodic checks to regulate effective earthquake and disaster control policies throughout the country with support from semi-government, private firms and NGOs. It also conducts mock drill, crises communication and a hazard hunt exercise among their staffers every two to three months. Recently, Delhi witnessed one of biggest mega mock drills conducted in India, simulating an earthquake of magnitude 7.2 on Richter Scale. The main purpose was to check the alertness and preparedness of various agencies, commuters in the event of a disaster of such magnitude. 
National Disaster Management Authority and Delhi Disaster Management Authority jointly conducted the drills at several places across the national capital including the six Metro Stations at 11.30 a.m.

Notes

Organizations established in 1995
Emergency management in India
Government agencies of India
Ministry of Home Affairs (India)